Kenas Adi Haryanto (born 26 June 1993) is an Indonesian badminton player affiliated with Djarum club.

Achievements

BWF International Challenge/Series (4 titles, 7 runners-up) 
Men's doubles

  BWF International Challenge tournament
  BWF International Series tournament

Performance timeline

Individual competitions 
 Senior level

References

External links 
 

1993 births
Living people
People from Kudus Regency
Sportspeople from Central Java
Indonesian male badminton players
21st-century Indonesian people